I Killed the Zeitgeist is the debut solo studio album by Manic Street Preachers bass guitarist and lyricist Nicky Wire. It was released on 25 September 2006 by record label Red Ink.

Background 

Many of the album's songs had previously appeared elsewhere in various formats. "I Killed the Zeitgeist" had been released on Christmas Day 2005 on the Manic Street Preachers' official site as a free download, while "The Shining Path" was released exclusively on iTunes for download. In addition, a promotional album sampler had been sent out to the press and certain other people which included "I Killed the Zeitgeist", "Goodbye Suicide", "Sehnsucht" and "Everything Fades".

Release 

"Break My Heart Slowly" was released as a single on 18 September 2006.

I Killed the Zeitgeist was released on 25 September 2006 by record label Red Ink.

Reception 

Stephen Thomas Erlewine of AllMusic described the album as "the sound of a slowly aging outsider who is reconnecting to his rebel roots. And that's what's really appealing about I Killed the Zeitgeist: it's rough and unfinished, but it's utterly alive, with its misfires as interesting as its successes, which, naturally, makes it not only a strong solo debut but some of Wire's most compelling music in years."

Track listing 

B Sides:
1) Casual Glam 
2) Derek Jarman's Garden
3) Afterbloom 
4) Daydreamer Eyes

Personnel 

 Nicky Wire – lead vocals, backing vocals, electric guitar, acoustic guitar, production, album design concept, sleeve photography

 Additional personnel

 James Dean Bradfield – guitar solos and backing vocals on "Withdraw Retreat" and "Kimono Rock"
 Nick Nasmyth – organ on "So Much for the Future"
 Greg Haver – drums, backing vocals, production

 Technical personnel

 Ryan Art – album artwork
 Loz Williams – engineering
 Shawn Joseph – mastering
 Mitch Ikeda – sleeve photography

References

External links 

 

2006 debut albums
Albums produced by Greg Haver